The Green Line is a light rail (LRT) line under construction in Calgary, Alberta, Canada. The line will run between Calgary’s north-central and southeastern boundaries, connecting with the Red Line and Blue Line in the city’s downtown. The Green Line is the largest public infrastructure project in Calgary's history and will be the first rail line in the city to operate low-floor trains. When completed, the Green Line will comprise 29 stations spanning . This will bring the total number of CTrain stations in Calgary to 74.

Like the Red Line and Blue Line, the Green Line is being constructed in stages. Stage one of construction features 15 stations (9 at-grade, 4 underground, 2 elevated) and is being funded with three roughly equal contributions from the City of Calgary, the Government of Alberta, and the Government of Canada.

Major construction was planned to begin in early 2021 but was delayed to April 2022 after Alberta’s United Conservative provincial government failed to contribute the province’s pledged portion of the line's funding and rebuked the project as a "line to nowhere", asserting that the City of Calgary did not have "any credible plan" despite nearly four decades of research and planning. This came after months of speculation from city officials, politicians, and journalists that the provincial government, oil tycoons and other executives associated with the United Conservative Party were attempting to stifle or cancel the Green Line despite its popular support.

Due to the provincial government's actions, the City of Calgary temporarily paused the project's procurement though planning, pre-construction and public engagement continued through 2021. Delays persisted until the project received final approval from Alberta’s provincial government on July 7, 2021, hours after Prime Minister Justin Trudeau met privately with Jason Kenney in Calgary. This meant the project had full approval from all three orders of government and Prime Minister Justin Trudeau stated “The money is there and the agreements are signed, so regardless of an election, the Green Line is going to go forward."

Construction of the Green Line officially began in April 2022 with PCL Construction selected as the construction management contractor for utility relocation work. The Green Line Board released the Request for Proposals (RFP) to select a proponent to construct phase one of stage one of construction, from Shepard to Eau Claire, on September 26, 2022. Stage one of construction is expected to be completed in 2027.

Description

The Green Line will be an urban and suburban light-rail line using low-floor trains, CAF Urbos 100, integrated as part of Calgary's CTrain system. Like the rest of Calgary’s rail transit network, the Green Line will be entirely powered by wind power. Operation of the line will be publicly funded by municipal taxation along with rider fares, and will be administered by Calgary Transit.

Generally, stations will be smaller and less elaborate than existing CTrain stations, due to the use of low-floor trains. The southeast segment of the line will run as a light metro similar to the existing Red Line and Blue Line, with dedicated tracks, bells and gates on at-grade crossings and free standing stations. The track between 26 Avenue SE station and Ramsay/Inglewood station is then elevated on a guideway similar to the existing Sunalta station.

The line then heads completely underground with four underground stations through the Beltline, the Centre City, and Eau Claire. The underground segment begins at a tunnel portal at 11 Avenue and 6 Street SE adjacent to the Victoria Park Bus Garage. It will enter the Beltline in a shallow tunnel below 11 Avenue SE, stopping underground at 4 Street SE and Centre Street South stations before reorienting northward and entering the centre city under 2 Street SW.

The train then stops underground at 7 Avenue SW station in Calgary’s urban core, providing direct transfer to the existing Red Line and Blue Line. The train will continue north, stopping underground at 2 Avenue SW station in Eau Claire, exiting at a tunnel portal integrated into the Eau Claire Market, which will be redeveloped similar to the Central Library to accommodate the train.

Then, an elevated guideway with two multi-use pathways will take tracks to Centre Street, north of the Centre Street Bridge. The train will then run northward in the centre two lanes of Centre Street in a dedicated right of way as an urban tramway similar to along 7th Avenue in the downtown, leaving two lanes for car traffic south of McKnight Boulevard and four lanes north of McKnight Boulevard.

The train will run without gates, bells or fences on most at-grade crossings along Centre Street. The train will then continue northward; tracks will eventually enter into the median of Harvest Hills Boulevard, and the line will eventually span north of Stoney Trail into the exurban community of Keystone.

Stations and route

This will bring the total number of CTrain stations in Calgary to 74. The planned Green Line corridor is currently served via three bus rapid transit (BRT) routes: Route 300 (operating the Calgary International Airport and downtown, primarily along Centre Street), Route 301 (between North Pointe and downtown) and Route 302 (between Seton and downtown). Like the Red Line and Blue Line, the Green Line will be built in stages. Stage one of construction will extend from 16 Avenue North at 16 Avenue N station, through downtown Calgary, to 126 Avenue SE at Shepard station.

Stage one of construction will be built incrementally in two smaller phases:
 Phase 1: Shepard to Eau Claire station, including the downtown tunnel (under construction)
 Phase 2: Eau Claire station to 16 Avenue N station including the Bow River crossing

Green Line (stage one)

Planned northern expansion

Planned southeastern expansion

Expansion timeline and funding
Though the alignment and general design of future expansions have been approved by the city council, the timeline and funding of future extensions has not yet been determined. Construction stage one builds the most complex and the most expensive segment of the line first - allowing incremental, relatively simple expansion of the line as funding becomes available. The full build-out of the line is estimated to require an additional CA$2–3 billion.

In 2019, several potential stage two build-outs were evaluated for variable amounts of potential future funding. These were:
$250–400 million:
South to McKenzie Towne
 $400–700 million:
North to 40 Avenue N or
South to Auburn Bay/ Mahogany
 $700 million–$1 billion:
North to 64 Avenue N or
South to Seton or
North to 40 Avenue N and south to Auburn Bay/ Mahogany

Additional infrastructure
When completed, stage one of the Green Line will feature:

  of track
 15 stations (9 at-grade, 4 underground, 2 elevated) 
 3 park and ride facilities with a total of 1,800 – 1,900 stalls (Lynnwood/Millican, Douglas Glen, and Shepard)
  of elevated track between Ramsay/Inglewood to 26 Avenue SE stations
 1 light rail vehicle (LRV) maintenance and storage facility, north of Shepard station

When the full line is complete, it will also feature 12 bridges, 10 park and ride facilities (with 5,000 to 6,000 parking stalls), 10 tunnels (including the -long centre city tunnel from 2 St SW in Eau Claire to Olympic Way SE in Victoria Park, a bridge connecting Eau Claire to Centre Street North, and 2 LRV maintenance and storage facilities (at Shepard and 96 Avenue N).

Impact

The megaproject is expected to have far-reaching impacts to the mobility, economics and quality of life of hundreds of thousands of Calgarians. The Green Line will be entirely powered by wind generated electricity, reducing greenhouse gas emissions by 67,000 tonnes of carbon dioxide per year, equivalent to 14,200 fewer vehicles on Calgary's roadways. This saves 22 million litres of gasoline and diesel fuel yearly and reduces city-wide smog by 2%.

Deerfoot Trail is currently the primary transportation route from north-central to southeast Calgary. It is the busiest freeway in Alberta, and suffers from chronic congestion. Calgarians spent an average of 15.7 hours in peak hour congestion in 2016. The Green Line alignment runs adjacent to Deerfoot Trail and is expected to be a catalyst for reducing traffic on the arterial route, as well as having impacts on traffic city wide.

The completed Green Line will reduce city-wide congestion by 10-15% and reduce total vehicle kilometres traveled by up to 40%. Additionally, the line will reduce travel times for existing north-central BRT and southeast BRT riders by an average of 25 minutes. Centre Street between 9 Avenue N - McKnight Blvd will be reduced to two lanes for vehicle traffic, converting the road from an arterial through-road to a local street. Those wishing to travel between downtown — McKnight Blvd using Centre Street will be encouraged to ride the CTrain, or take alternate routes such as Edmonton Trail or 14 Street NW.

The line will contribute towards Calgary's economic recovery in response to the COVID-19 pandemic by generating 20,000 jobs for the construction of stage one alone, and by connecting 200,000 jobs within walking distance of the route. When completed, it’s expected that 140,000 people will ride the Green Line every day. Stage one of construction is expected to have a daily ridership of 65,000 people.

History

Early history
Trams ran on the surface of Centre Street for 41 years, from 1909 to 1950. The Green Line will restore the historic alignment of Calgary’s trams, running trains on the surface of Centre Street as well.    

The Green Line was first envisioned in 1983, two years after Calgary’s first LRT line opened. As early as 1986, the communities of McKenzie Towne, New Brighton and Copperfield had set aside land along 52 Street SE for the future line. In 1987, the city then conducted the Southeast Mass Transit Corridor Study and concluded that southeast Calgary would one day require a dedicated light rail line.

Original proposal
In 2010, the city anticipated that the Green Line would be required before Calgary’s population reached 1.25 million, though the city surpassed that population just 5 years later. Chronic congestion on Deerfoot Trail is partly attributed to the failure to construct the Green Line before the 1.25 million population target.

In 2011, the city began considering three possible alignments for the north-central leg of the Green Line: along Nose Creek adjacent to Deerfoot Trail, on Edmonton Trail, or on Centre Street. After engagement with the public, the city selected Centre Street as the preferred alignment.

In 2012, the Green Line was proposed as two separate new lines — one from downtown to north central and one from downtown to the southeast. The division of the line was rejected by council. Through 2016, $101 million had been spent on right-of-way acquisition and preliminary studies.

In May 2017, the city revealed the line's suggested alignment and announced it would be built in stages due to the unexpectedly high costs of certain design choices. Although the original estimate for the entire 28-station Green Line was $4.5 billion, the cost of stage one alone, including the $1.95 billion cost of the centre city tunnel, was estimated at $4.65 billion.

Funding and alignment changes
In 2015, the Government of Canada announced that it would invest a historic $1.53 billion in the Green Line, the single largest federal investment for an infrastructure project in Alberta. In early 2019, Alberta’s NDP provincial government committed $1.53 billion in funding paid for by the provincial carbon tax. Over time, the City of Calgary set aside funding for the Green Line and has designated a $1.53 billion investment in the project. The Green Line is funded by three roughly equal contributions from all three orders of government.

In late 2019, after the 2019 Alberta General Election, the newly elected United Conservative provincial government cut the Green Line’s budget by 86% and passed legislation allowing their government to terminate their contribution “without cause” and with only 90 days notice. This move complicated the city’s ability to move forward with the project, hindered the city’s access to the federal government’s investment and raised uncertainty among potential procurement bidders.

On May 12, 2020, the city announced changes to the alignment of the line to keep the project within budget. The revised alignment replaced the deep-earth tunnel under the Bow River with an elevated guideway over the east end of Prince's Island Park. The elimination of the tunnel under the river significantly reduces construction cost and risk.

The changes also brought the line to the surface between 9 Avenue N and 16 Avenue N, running along the two centre lanes of Centre Street in a dedicated right of way. The Green Line north of 16 Avenue N has been planned as a surface running train since the city’s 2017 recommendations. The changes also included the addition of 9 Avenue N station in Crescent Heights, increasing the number of stations in stage one of construction to 15, and bringing the total number of stations to 29. 2 Avenue SW station and 4 Street SE station were moved from being at-grade to underground and the Beltline section of the line was moved one block north to run under 11 Avenue South, rather than under 12 Avenue South as initially recommended.

The plan for a tunnel under the intersection of Barlow Trail and 114 Avenue SE was scrapped in favour of an elevated guideway over the intersection, and the park and ride at Shepard station was revised from a parkade to a surface parking lot.

Opposition
As the megaproject's approval was looming in early 2020, a group of wealthy oil industry and business executives, all with ties to the United Conservative Party, organized an invite only event at the Calgary Petroleum Club with city officials. Despite speculation that the group's objective was to cancel the project despite its popular public support, some attendees insisted otherwise. One of the participants, oil industry executive Jim Gray, suggested the group was not opposed to the line but instead wanted to "de-risk" it.

The group called for replacing half of the rail line with a bus, cancelling the downtown subway, and for the use of high-floor trains. The group also funneled thousands of dollars into an online advertising campaign opposing the Green Line under the titles of "An Ad Hoc Committee of Calgary Citizens", "Rethink the Green Line", and "Green Line Done Right". Facebook says the group’s ads were seen by millions of Albertans.

The group also published editorials in local newspapers, like the Calgary Herald, making a variety of dubious claims about the project and calling for its pause or cancellation. Additionally, the group hung anti-Green Line flyers in communities around the city and operated a website opposing the Green Line. In December 2020, the United Conservative Minister of Transportation, Ric McIver, rebuked the Green Line saying in a statement that the train is a "line to nowhere" and the city does not have "any credible plan". After an additional 6 months of delays subsequent to McIver’s statement saying the project’s technical plans were inadequate, the province then announced the technical issues had been resolved despite no changes to the line’s design or alignment.

Despite the issue cited as the reason the province failed to contribute their pledged portion of the project’s funding being resolved, the United Conservative provincial government then announced that it would continue withholding funding, the city needed to produce a new business case for the line, and it would be investing in the widening of Deerfoot Trail. The Alberta provincial government has also retained legislation allowing them to revoke their contribution with only 90 days notice. Officials say this move complicates the project’s procurement, increased the project’s overall cost by millions of dollars and delayed the project by one year. Despite these actions, the provincial government maintains publicly that they support the idea of the Green Line.

On July 7, 2021, Prime Minister Justin Trudeau met privately with then-Alberta Premier Jason Kenney at the Fairmount Palliser Hotel in downtown Calgary. Less than three hours later, the Alberta Government announced it had approved the Green Line without modifications and would contribute their pledged portion of the line's funding. After over a year of delays inflicted by the provincial government, Prime Minister Justin Trudeau, Mayor Naheed Nenshi, members of council, and various other stakeholders gathered at the Oliver Bowen Light Rail Maintenance Facility in Calgary to announce the Green Line would continue as planned. Jason Kenney declined to attend the announcement and sent no provincial representatives.

Alberta’s newly selected Premier Danielle Smith called the Green Line a “catastrophically bad decision”, a “fantasy”, and an “excessively expensive line that goes nowhere and never will”. Danielle Smith also asserted that the Green Line is “of no real use to anyone”, praised the organized effort to stifle or cancel the Green Line, and called for replacing half of the rail line with a bus.

Approval and public opinion
On June 16, 2020, council voted 14 to 1 to approve construction stage one of the Green Line despite vocal opposition from a small group of wealthy and influential businesspeople. The project received final approval from all three orders of government on July 7, 2021. Several polls conducted in 2020 and 2021 have suggested that the megaproject has popular public support. A poll conducted in June 2020 found 68.7% of Calgarians in support of the project with its updated 2020 alignment. According to a 2021 survey conducted by the City of Calgary, 90% of respondents said the Green Line is important to the future of the city and 89% said it is an important addition to the city’s transportation network.

The CA$5.5 billion cost of stage one will be shared in roughly equal portions between the federal government, provincial government, and the City of Calgary. On July 10, 2021, Prime Minister Justin Trudeau said "The money is there and the agreements are signed, so regardless of an election, the Green Line is going to go forward."

Construction
The City of Calgary began preparing for construction in 2017 with utility relocation and environmental redemption projects along the alignment of the line and spent over $500 million. In November 2021, Construcciones y Auxiliar de Ferrocarriles (CAF) was awarded the contract to supply Green Line’s new fleet of low floor trains.

Construction on the Green Line officially began in April 2022 with PCL Construction selected as the construction management contractor. The Green Line Board released the Request for Proposals (RFP) to select a proponent to construct phase one of stage one of construction, from Shepard to Eau Claire, on September 26, 2022. The RFP was released to the two proponent teams, Bow Transit Connectors (Barnard Constructors of Canada LP, Flatiron Constructors Canada Ltd, and WSP Canada Inc) and City Link Partners (Aecon Infrastructure Management Inc, Dragados Canada Inc, Acciona Infrastructure Canada Inc, Parsons Inc, and AECOM Canada Ltd).

Stage one of construction is expected to be completed in 2027.

See also
Blue Line (Calgary)
Red Line (Calgary)

References

External links
 Green Line LRT Long Term Vision: 160 Avenue N to Seton, in twelve parts:

 1
 2
 3
 4
 5
 6
 7
 8
 9
 10
 11
 12

 published by City of Calgary

CTrain
Rapid transit lines in Canada